The Radisson Blu Iveria Hotel is a hotel in the city center of Tbilisi located on Rose Revolution Square. The hotel was built in 1967 by the Soviet government as the premier luxury hotel of the Georgian Soviet Socialist Republic and was named Hotel Iveria after the ancient kingdom of Iveria. As a result of the war in Abkhazia in 1992, the hotel became a refugee camp housing more than 800 refugees. In 2004 the refugees were removed from the hotel and offered $7000 per room. The dilapidated hotel was stripped down to its steel structural frame and completely rebuilt as a modern luxury business hotel, managed by the Radisson Hotels group. It reopened in 2009 as the Radisson Blu Iveria Hotel.

References

External links and references 
 Official Homepage

Hotels in Tbilisi
Radisson Blu
Skyscraper hotels
Hotels established in 1967
Hotels established in 2009
Hotel buildings completed in 1967
Hotel buildings completed in 2009
1967 establishments in the Soviet Union
Hotels built in the Soviet Union